Dennis Lee Sherrill is a former Major League Baseball player for the New York Yankees. Despite playing just five games, Sherrill managed to play four different positions: designated hitter, shortstop, second base, and third base (twice).

Sources

Major League Baseball infielders
New York Yankees players
Fort Lauderdale Yankees players
West Haven Yankees players
Syracuse Chiefs players
Columbus Clippers players
Baseball players from Florida
1956 births
Living people
South Miami Senior High School alumni